Jowzan or Jauzan or Juzan or Jozan may refer to the following places in Iran:
 Juzan, Fars, a village in Nasrovan Rural District, Fars Province
 Jowzan, Hamadan, a village in Jowzan Rural District, Hamadan Province
 Juzan, Hamadana village in Muzaran Rural District, Hamadan Province
 Jowzan, Hormozgan, village in Howmeh Rural District, Hormozgan Province
 Jowzan, Rudan, a village in Rudkhaneh Bar Rural District, Hormozgan Province
 Jowzan, Razavi Khorasan, a village in Dowlatkhaneh Rural District, Razavi Khorasan Province
 Jowzan Rural District, Malayer County, Hamadan Province

See also
Juzan
Jozan (disambiguation)